"Words as Weapons" is a song by English musician Birdy. It was released as a digital download on 14 April 2014 in the United Kingdom, as the fourth single from her second studio album, Fire Within (2013). The song was written by Birdy and Ryan Tedder, who also produced the song.

Music video 
The music video for the song was released on YouTube on March 27 2014. It features Birdy as a ghost haunting her ex-boyfriend for his abusive behavior.

Track listing

Chart performance

Weekly charts

Release history

References

External links
 Words As Weapons at Youtube

2013 songs
2014 singles
Birdy (singer) songs
Songs written by Ryan Tedder
Song recordings produced by Ryan Tedder
Warner Music Group singles
Music videos directed by Sophie Muller